The Ride is a 2018 independent film about a child who is fostered by an interracial couple, starring Shane Graham, Ludacris, and Sasha Alexander.  

It was released in North America in 2020 on Amazon Prime.

References 

2018 independent films